Maltepe is an underground station on the M4 line of the Istanbul Metro in Maltepe. It is located beneath the Maltepe Interchange, on the D.100 State Highway, in the Zümrütevler neighborhood. Connection to IETT city buses and Istanbul Minibus service is available. The station consists of an island platform with two tracks and was opened on 17 August 2012.

Station Layout

References

Railway stations opened in 2012
Istanbul metro stations
Maltepe, Istanbul
2012 establishments in Turkey